Celebration City was a theme park located in Branson, Missouri, United States. It was themed after America in the 20th century, with areas based on Route 66, Small-town America in the 1900s, and a beachside boardwalk in the 1920s. As a "sister park" to Herschend Family Entertainment's Silver Dollar City theme park located nearby, It was meant to continue the day where Silver Dollar City's 19th century theming left off. It opened in the afternoon into the evening, with the operating day capped off by a laser and fireworks display.

The park featured many rides, shows, and attractions. Its operating season ran from May until mid-September.

History
An amusement park named Branson USA was opened on the site in 1999. It struggled in its early years and closed in 2001. Herschend Family Entertainment Corporation purchased it in 2002 with plans to redevelop and reopen it. It was reopened as Celebration City in 2003, after a redesign and expansion the Branson Courier reported had a cost of over $40 million. It was equipped with a laser, water, and fireworks show, a wooden roller coaster, and a brand new log flume ride in 2008.

On October 24, 2008, Herschend Family Entertainment Corporation announced that the park would not reopen for 2009, due to unmet financial expectations. It closed on October 25, 2008. Herschend continues to operate the nearby Silver Dollar City and White Water Branson parks; in announcing the closure, the company stated "...the company is already exploring various new development concepts for the site including an aquarium, other family attractions, retheming the current park and also, destination retail and dining."

Rides
Since the park closed, some rides have been moved to other locations, and some remain in place. They included:
Accelerator, a S&S double shot tower, installed by Ride Entertainment Group (which has been moved to Silver Dollar City as Firefall)
Bumble Bee, a kiddie ride frog hopper
Chaos, a Chance Rides ride(removed)
Electric Star Wheel, a Ferris wheel
Fireball, a swinging claw ride
Flying Aces, a kiddie ride
Flying Carpet, a Cliffhanger ride
Flying Circus, a Larson Flying Scooters ride (which has been moved to Wild Adventures) 
Freefall, a milder version of Accelerator
Frisco Line, a kiddie train ride
Jack Rabbit, a steel roller coaster (Built by E&F Miler Industries in 2003 which has been moved to Fun Spot Kissimmee as Hurricane.)
Orbiter, Flying Carpet ride
Ozark Wildcat, a GCI wooden roller coaster built in 2003. It was demolished on December 15, 2015.
Paris Wheel
Roaring Falls, a Shoot-the-Chutes ride, it opened in 2008 and was relocated from Geauga Lake
Route 66 Speedway, a large go-kart track
Scrambler (which has been moved to Wild Adventures) 
Shoot-D-Chute, a log flume
Stinger, a Wisdom Rides Tornado
Slick's Slightly Used Cars, bumper cars
Swing & Twirl
Thunderbolt, a steel roller coaster (relocated to Glenwood Caverns Adventure Park as Cliffhanger)
Vintage Carousel, a carousel

References

External links
Amusement Planet Photo Gallery
Aerial video of abandoned park by Phantom 2 Drone
Herschend Family Entertainment
SDCFans.com - A Fansite
Video of Celebration City's nightly laser and fireworks display

Defunct amusement parks in the United States
Buildings and structures in Taney County, Missouri
2003 establishments in Missouri
2008 disestablishments in Missouri
Amusement parks opened in 2003
Amusement parks closed in 2008
Modern ruins